The canton of Liffré is an administrative division of the Ille-et-Vilaine department, in northwestern France. At the French canton reorganisation which came into effect in March 2015, it was expanded from 8 to 9 communes. Its seat is in Liffré.

Composition

Composition since 2015 
Since the 2015 departmental elections, the canton of Liffré has re-grouped nine communes in their entirety:

See also 

 Cantons of the Ille-et-Vilaine department

References

Cantons of Ille-et-Vilaine